Adjutant Andre Marie Paul Petit-Delchet was a French World War I flying ace credited with five confirmed aerial victories and two probable ones.

Biography
See also Aerial victory standards of World War I

Andre Marie Paul Petit-Delchet was born in Villers-sur-Mer, France on 29 September 1892.

Petit-Delchet enlisted in a French-Algerian military unit at the outbreak of World War I. He transferred to a French cavalry regiment. On 1 November 1915, he reported for aviation training. He was granted a Military Pilot's Brevet in May 1916. After advanced training, he was posted to Escadrille N.69 on 21 December 1916.

Some time later, he was pulled from combat for additional training. On 29 March 1918, he returned to the front as an Adjutant pilot for Escadrille SPA.57. On 21 April, he began a string of five victories--the first three being enemy airplanes, the last two observation balloons.
French fighter pilots in 1918 were hunting Germans in packs; Petit-Delchet shared four of his victories, with such fellow aces as Marius Hasdenteufel, Marcel Nogues, and Charles Nuville.

On 28 July 1918, Petit-Delchet was taking off for a combat patrol when he crashed and died. By the time of his death, he had been awarded the Médaille militaire and the Croix de Guerre with four palmes and three etoiles.

Sources of information

Reference
 Franks, Norman; Bailey, Frank (1993). Over the Front: The Complete Record of the Fighter Aces and Units of the United States and French Air Services, 1914–1918. London, UK: Grub Street Publishing. .

1918 deaths
1892 births
People from Villers-sur-Mer
French World War I flying aces